Roberto Previtali  (born 3 August 1981) is a former Italian footballer who played as a midfielder.

Club career

Early career
Born in Trescore Balneario, the Province of Bergamo, Previtali started his professional career with Atalanta. He made his Serie A debut on 22 April 2001  against Perugia. He started that match and the Bergamo side 2-2 draw with Perugia away. Previtali graduated from the Primavera under-20 team in June and left for Serie C1 side Lumezzane on loan in July, along with Mauro Minelli, which also located in Lombardy region. His loan with Lumezzane was extended but in August 2002 left for his former club Alzano Virescit, which also a Serie C1 and Lombardy club.

In summer 2003 he left for Serie C1 side Spezia in co-ownership deal, along with Federico Pettinà. In exchange, Nicola Mingazzini joined opposite side for undisclosed fee and in co-ownership deal.

In June 2004, Spezia bought the remain registration rights of the players from Atalanta . But in July 2004, he was sold back to the Province of Bergamo for Serie B side AlbinoLeffe.

AlbinoLeffe
In the first 2 seasons with AlbinoLeffe, he was not the regular starter. He made a break through in 2006-07 season, made 26 league appearances (which started 22 of them). But in 2007-08 season, he just made 7 league appearances (plus 1 in playoffs, total 8), which that season was the best season of AlbinoLeffe in recent years, finished the 4th and as the losing side of promotion playoffs.

In 2008–09 and 2009–10 season, he re–gained his regular place, started 52 league matches in possible 82 matches, and also made 7 substitute appearances. he missed a few games in 2011–12 Serie B due to injury. After the club relegated and was fined heavily due to involvement in 2011 Italian football scandal, he left for fellow third division club Cremonese. On 30 January 2013 he terminated the contract in order to re-join AlbinoLeffe.

International career
Previtali was a member of the Italy national under–20 football team, and made 2 appearances for the side in the Four Nations Tournament.

References

External links
 Lega Serie B Profile 
 La Gazzetta dello Sport Profile (2009–10 season) 
 AlbinoLeffe Profile (2008–09) 
 Football.it Profile 
 
 FIGC national team data 

Italian footballers
Serie A players
Serie B players
Serie C players
Virtus Bergamo Alzano Seriate 1909 players
Atalanta B.C. players
F.C. Lumezzane V.G.Z. A.S.D. players
Spezia Calcio players
U.C. AlbinoLeffe players
Italy youth international footballers
Association football midfielders
People from Trescore Balneario
1981 births
Living people
Sportspeople from the Province of Bergamo
Footballers from Lombardy